Jolanda Slenter  (born ) is a Dutch female Paralympic sitting volleyball player. She is part of the Netherlands women's national sitting volleyball team.

She competed at the 2004 Summer Paralympics, 2008 Summer Paralympics, and 2012 Summer Paralympics, finishing 4th, after losing from Ukraine in the bronze medal match.
On club level she played for Holyoke in 2012.

See also
 Netherlands at the 2012 Summer Paralympics

References

1965 births
Living people
Dutch sitting volleyball players
Dutch sportswomen
Paralympic volleyball players of the Netherlands
Sportspeople from Maastricht
Volleyball players at the 2004 Summer Paralympics
Volleyball players at the 2012 Summer Paralympics
Women's sitting volleyball players